The men's pole vault events at the 2014 World Junior Championships in Athletics took place at Hayward Field in Eugene, Oregon on 24 and 26 July.

Medalists

Records

Results

Qualification
Qualification: Standard 5.25 m (Q) or at least 12 best performers (q).

Final
Summary:

References

External links
 WJC14 pole vault schedule

Pole vault
Pole vault at the World Athletics U20 Championships